Lomwe may refer to:
Lomwe language
Lomwe people

Language and nationality disambiguation pages